Ventura Bufalini (died 15 August 1504) was a Roman Catholic prelate who served as Bishop of Terni (1499–1504)
and Bishop of Città di Castello (1498–1499).

Biography
On 18 January 1498, Ventura Bufalini was appointed by Pope Alexander VI as Bishop of Città di Castello.
On 17 April 1499, he was appointed by Pope Alexander VI as Bishop of Terni. 
He served as Bishop of Terni until his death on 15 August 1504.

See also
Catholic Church in Italy

References

External links and additional sources
 (for Chronology of Bishops) 
 (for Chronology of Bishops) 
 (for Chronology of Bishops) 
 (for Chronology of Bishops) 

15th-century Italian Roman Catholic bishops
16th-century Italian Roman Catholic bishops
1504 deaths
Bishops appointed by Pope Alexander VI